Panos Kallitsis (born February 23, 1974) is a Greek hairstylist and make-up artist.

Early life
Panos Kallitsis was born in Athens and raised in Piraeus. The first stimulants into the fashion industry and styling came from his father, also a hair stylist at the time.

From a very young age he realizes that styling was what he wanted to do. He starts by working in Athens, but very soon in the age of 20, he moves to London where he studies make up and hair styling. In parallel he works part-time for shows and fashion events. In 1998 he moves to Brussels where he studies in the Vidal Sassoon school with a scholarship.

In 2000 he returns to Greece, where very quickly he achieves acknowledgement as one of the most influential Greek makeup artists.

Career
During the last decade  Panos Kallitsis has worked in practically all aspects of the Greek show business, from creating hairstyles for models on catwalks, magazine covers and beauty contests to make up and makeovers for famous actors, TV hosts and journalists.

He has worked exclusively with almost all prominent Greek designers, major magazines such as Celebrity, Woman, Madame Figaro, Elle, Esquire, Nitro, Status and many of the most famous names in the Greek fashion, TV and music industry such as singers Haris Alexiou, Giannis Kotsiras and Despina Vandi, TV hosts Eleonora Meleti, Eleni Menegaki, Elena Katritsi  and Sakis Rouvas.

His work has been featured many times on some of the most popular Greek fashion magazines and fashion shows.

Although he is regarded by many as a celebrity makeup artist and hairstylist, he says that his work does not have to do with someone being famous or not, but with trying to create for anyone a “unique style”.

References

External links 
 Official Website
 Official Page in Facebook
 Official WebTV Channel in Youtube

1975 births
Living people
Greek make-up artists
Greek hairdressers
People from Piraeus